Gnomidolon fraternum is a species of beetle in the family Cerambycidae. It was described by Martins in 1971.

References

Gnomidolon
Beetles described in 1971